The 1966 Newfoundland general election was held on 8 September 1966 to elect members of the 34th General Assembly of Newfoundland. It was won by the Liberal party.

Results

Notes

References

Further reading
 

Elections in Newfoundland and Labrador
1966 elections in Canada
1966 in Newfoundland and Labrador
September 1966 events in Canada